William James Girling  (9 March 1882 – 7 September 1973) was a Reform Party Member of Parliament in New Zealand.

He was elected to the Wairau electorate in the 1922 general election, but was defeated in 1928 by Edward Healy of the United Party by a 3% vote margin. He was elected as Mayor of Blenheim and served from 1945 to 1950. Part of the agreement was that all incumbents would become the coalition's candidate. Girling stood as an independent in 1931 in opposition to Healy but was again unsuccessful, this time by a 15% vote margin.

In 1935, he was awarded the King George V Silver Jubilee Medal. In November 1947, he was elected Grand Master of the Masonic Order in New Zealand.

In the 1950 King's Birthday Honours, Girling was appointed a Commander of the Order of the British Empire for public services, especially in the Marlborough provincial district. He was appointed to the Legislative Council on 22 June 1950 as a member of the so-called suicide squad to vote for its abolition.

Girling died in 1973 and was buried at Omaka Cemetery, Blenheim.

References

External links
Obituary held by Auckland City Libraries

1882 births
1973 deaths
Reform Party (New Zealand) MPs
Members of the New Zealand Legislative Council
New Zealand MPs for South Island electorates
Members of the New Zealand House of Representatives
Mayors of Blenheim, New Zealand
Unsuccessful candidates in the 1928 New Zealand general election
Unsuccessful candidates in the 1931 New Zealand general election
Burials at Omaka Cemetery
New Zealand Commanders of the Order of the British Empire
Masonic Grand Masters